The mixed 50 metre running target was a shooting sports event held as part of the Shooting at the 1980 Summer Olympics programme. It was the third appearance of the event. The competition was held on 23 to 24 July 1980 at the shooting ranges in Moscow. 19 shooters from 10 nations competed.

Results

References

Shooting at the 1980 Summer Olympics